Douglas Laird Turner (January 5, 1932 – November 4, 2018) was an American rower, journalist and newspaper executive. He competed in the men's coxed four event at the 1956 Summer Olympics.

Turner graduated from Brown University in 1954. The following year he enlisted in the United States Army and served two years as a Special Agent for Counter Intelligence. In 1957 he went to work for the Buffalo Courier-Express where he served in several editorial positions eventually becoming Executive Editor. After the closing of the Courier Express he became Washington Bureau Chief of The Buffalo News, serving in that capacity from 1982 to 2007.

References

External links
 

1932 births
2018 deaths
American male rowers
Olympic rowers of the United States
Rowers at the 1956 Summer Olympics
Rowers from Buffalo, New York
Military personnel from Buffalo, New York
Brown University alumni
Journalists from Upstate New York